Riley Michael Sheahan (born December 7, 1991) is a Canadian professional ice hockey centre for EHC Biel of the National League (NL). He was drafted 21st overall by the Detroit Red Wings in the 2010 NHL Entry Draft. Sheahan has previously played in the National Hockey League (NHL) for the Red Wings, Pittsburgh Penguins, Florida Panthers, Edmonton Oilers, Buffalo Sabres and Seattle Kraken.

Early life
Sheahan was born on December 7, 1991, in St. Catharines, Ontario, to Mike and Peggy Sheahan. Basketball was the dominant sport in his family, as both of his parents had played: his mother and her twin sister were Ontario University Athletics all-stars for Brock University, while his father coached high school basketball after his playing career ended. Sheahan was a shooting guard for St. Francis Catholic Secondary School until ninth grade, when he decided that he would rather focus on ice hockey than basketball.

Playing career

Junior
Sheahan played junior B ice hockey in the Greater Ontario Junior Hockey League with the St. Catharines Falcons playing both centre and wing. During his first season with the Falcons, Sheahan played with Atlanta Thrashers first round pick Daultan Leveille. Sheahan collected 49 goals and 85 assists over two seasons with the Falcons. He was recognized for his offensive output with the OHA Junior B Top Prospect Award in 2008.

College
Following the two seasons in St. Catharines, Sheahan decided to forgo major junior hockey with the Erie Otters of the Ontario Hockey League (OHL) to play NCAA Division I college ice hockey with the University of Notre Dame Fighting Irish of the Central Collegiate Hockey Association (CCHA). While with the Fighting Irish, Sheahan was invited to take part in Canada's 2011 National Junior Team selection camp

Professional

Detroit Red Wings
On April 5, 2012, the Detroit Red Wings signed Sheahan to a three-year, entry-level contract. On April 7, 2012, he made his NHL debut for Detroit against the Chicago Blackhawks. On January 11, 2014, Sheahan scored his first career NHL goal, against Jonathan Quick of the Los Angeles Kings. On July 1, 2014, the Detroit Red Wings signed Sheahan to a two-year, $1.9 million contract extension. On June 16, 2016, the Red Wings signed Sheahan to another two-year contract extension.

On April 9, 2017, Sheahan scored his only two goals of the 2016–17 season during the final game at Joe Louis Arena, including the final goal in the arena's history. Sheahan had set a team record for the most games to start the season without a goal and he also set an NHL record as the only forward with at least 100 shots to start the season without a goal.

Pittsburgh Penguins
On October 21, 2017, Sheahan was traded to the Pittsburgh Penguins (along with a fifth-round pick in the 2018 NHL Entry Draft) in exchange for Scott Wilson and a third-round pick in 2018. He finished the 2017–18 season with 32 points in 81 games. On June 27, 2018, Sheahan signed a one-year contract with the Penguins.

Florida Panthers
On February 1, 2019, Sheahan was traded to the Florida Panthers (along with teammate Derick Brassard, a second-round pick and two fourth-round picks) in exchange for Nick Bjugstad and Jared McCann. He finished the 2018–19 season with 19 points in 82 games.

Edmonton Oilers
On September 5, 2019, Sheahan signed a one-year, $900,000 contract with the Edmonton Oilers. He skated in 66 regular season games with the club, scoring 15 points. He also went scoreless in four postseason games.

Buffalo Sabres
On December 29, 2020, Sheahan signed a professional tryout contract with the Buffalo Sabres to attend their training camp. On January 8, 2021, the Sabres signed Sheahan to a one-year, $700,000 contract. In the shortened  season, Sheahan appeared in 53 regular season games for the Sabres in a checking-line role. He contributed with 4 goals and 13 points, as the club finished bottom of the league.

Seattle Kraken
As a free agent from the Sabres, Sheahan was signed to a one-year, $850,000 contract with expansion club the Seattle Kraken on September 1, 2021. Sheahan scored the Kraken’s first ever preseason goal on September 26, 2021 in a 5-3 win against the Vancouver Canucks. After making the Kraken opening night roster, Sheahan endured a short assignment to the Charlotte Checkers of the AHL, before returning and remaining on the Kraken in a depth forward role. He appeared in 69 regular season games, used as the teams primary penalty killer, in collecting 4 goals and 13 assists for 17 points.

Return to Buffalo
On August 10, 2022, Sheahan as a free agent returned to the Buffalo Sabres, on a one-year, two-way, $950,000 contract. On October 31, 2022, Sheahan was assigned to the Rochester Americans of the American Hockey League after being waived by the Sabres. The Sabres brought him back to their NHL roster on November 15, 2022. On November 27, 2022, after two games with the Sabres, Sheahan was placed on unconditional waivers for the purpose of terminating his contract because of Sheahan’s refusal to return to AHL affiliate, Rochester Americans.

EHC Biel
On December 1, 2022, Sheahan joined EHC Biel of the National League (NL) for the remainder of the 2022–23 season.

Personal life
Sheahan is the nephew by marriage of Rocky DiPietro, a member of the Canadian Football Hall of Fame. He plays guitar in his free time. In 2021, Sheahan and fellow hockey player Tyler Smith started the Speak Your Mind podcast to address mental health issues in and out of professional sports.

Legal issues
On October 29, 2012, Sheahan was stopped by police in Grand Rapids, Michigan, after which a roadside test determined he was driving with a blood-alcohol level of 0.30, nearly four times the legal limit. Sheahan was wearing a purple Teletubby costume and was carrying the ID of fellow Red Wings' prospect Brendan Smith when arrested. He told police he was carrying Smith's ID so he could get into bars, as he was underage at the time.

Sheahan pleaded guilty in Michigan's 61st District Court on December 13, 2012, to operating a car with a blood-alcohol level of 0.17 or higher. He was sentenced to one year probation and ordered to spend 49 hours on a work crew.

Sheahan had previously been arrested on alcohol-related charges when he was charged with public intoxication and consumption of alcohol by a minor in 2010 when he was a freshman at Notre Dame.

Career statistics

Awards and honours

References

External links
 

1991 births
Living people
Buffalo Sabres players
Canadian expatriate ice hockey players in the United States
Canadian ice hockey centres
Canadian people of Irish descent
Detroit Red Wings draft picks
Detroit Red Wings players
Edmonton Oilers players
EHC Biel players
Florida Panthers players
Grand Rapids Griffins players
Ice hockey people from Ontario
National Hockey League first-round draft picks
Notre Dame Fighting Irish men's ice hockey players
Pittsburgh Penguins players
Rochester Americans players
Seattle Kraken players
Sportspeople from St. Catharines